BB8 may refer to:

 BB8, a postcode district in the BB postcode area around Blackburn, United Kingdom
 BB-8, a fictional robot from the Star Wars films
 BB8 is the name of a self driving car prototype from Nvidia as presented on CES 2017
 Black Brant 8, a Canadian sounding rocket
 , a United States Navy pre-dreadnought battleship commissioned in 1900 and scrapped in 1924
 Bb8, a chess move notation

See also
 Big Brother 8 (disambiguation)